My Blood is the sixth studio album by Danish thrash metal band Artillery. It was released in 2011 via Metal Mind Productions. It is the last Artillery album recorded with drummer Carsten Nielsen, who announced his departure from the band in April 2012.

Track listing

Personnel 
Søren Adamsen – vocals
Michael Stützer – guitars
Morten Stützer – guitars
Peter Thorslund – bass
Carsten Nielsen – drums

References

2011 albums
Artillery (band) albums
Metal Mind Productions albums